Nona Gaprindashvili (born 3 May 1941) is a former Soviet and Georgian chess player, and the first woman ever to be awarded the FIDE title Grandmaster in 1978. She was the fifth women's world chess champion (1962–1978).

Career

In 1961, aged 20, Gaprindashvili won the fourth women's Candidates Tournament, setting up a title match against world champion Elisaveta Bykova. She won the match easily, with a final score of 9–2 (+7−0=4), and went on to defend her title successfully four times: three times against Alla Kushnir (1965: 10–6; 1969: 12–7; 1972: 12–11) and once against Nana Alexandria (1975: 9–4). She finally lost her crown in 1978 to another Georgian, 17-year-old Maia Chiburdanidze, by the score 6½–8½ (+2−4=9).

Gaprindashvili played for the Soviet Union in the Women's Chess Olympiads of 1963, 1966, 1969, 1972, 1974, 1978, 1980, 1982, 1984, 1986, 1990, and for Georgia in 1992. She was one of the contributing players of the USSR team that dominated the Women's Olympiads of the 1980s. She won 25 medals, including eleven team gold medals and nine individual gold medals. At the Olympiad of Dubai 1986 she won all ten games she played.

Gaprindashvili was a five-time winner of the Women's Soviet Championship: in 1964, 1973, 1981, 1983, and 1985.

During her career, Gaprindashvili successfully competed in men's tournaments, winning amongst others the Hastings Challengers tournament in 1963/4. She tied for second place at Sandomierz in 1976, tied for first place at Lone Pine in 1977, and tied for second at Dortmund in 1978. Her performance at Lone Pine made her the first woman ever to earn a norm for the title of International Grandmaster. Although she did not achieve all of the norm requirements, she became the first woman to receive the International Grandmaster title from FIDE, in 1978.

In 1995, Gaprindashvili won the Women's World Senior Championship for the first time. She is the only female World Chess Champion to obtain the World Senior title as well. Gaprindashvili won the Senior title also in 2009, 2014, 2015, 2016, 2018 and 2019 (in the 65+ division since 2014). She also won the European Women's Seniors Championship in 2011, 2015, 2016, 2017 and 2018 (in the 65+ division since 2014). 

In 2005, at age 64, Gaprindashvili won the BDO Chess Tournament held in Haarlem, the Netherlands, with a score of 6½/10 points and a performance rating of 2510.

In 2021, Gaprindashvili appeared in the documentary Glory to the Queen, alongside Nana Alexandria, Maia Chiburdanidze and Nana Ioseliani.

Honors and awards 

Gaprindashvili was awarded the Presidential Order of Excellence in 2015 by President of Georgia Giorgi Margvelashvili for "her outstanding contribution to the country and nation" and "representing Georgia at an international level". In 2013, she was inducted into the World Chess Hall of Fame.

To honor her 75th birthday, on 3 May 2016, her star was opened near the Chess Palace. Also in 2016, FIDE President Kirsan Ilyumzhinov gave her a representation of Caïssa, in the shape of a chess queen, made by the Lobortas Classic Jewelry House.

"Nona" is a perfume named after her. The bottle is shaped like a chess queen. 

Tbilisi's chess palace is dedicated to Gaprindashvili.

Lawsuit 

Gaprindashvili was very briefly mentioned in the Netflix series The Queen's Gambit, in which it was incorrectly stated that she had never played competitive chess against men. Gaprindashvili characterized this departure from reality as "dishonouring ... misinformation." She filed a lawsuit against Netflix for US$5 million for false light invasion of privacy and defamation on 16 September 2021. In September 2022 Netflix settled with Gaprindashvili on undisclosed terms.

References

External links

1941 births
Living people
Women's world chess champions
Chess grandmasters
Female chess grandmasters
Chess woman grandmasters
World Senior Chess Champions
Female chess players from Georgia (country)
Soviet female chess players
People from Zugdidi
Burevestnik (sports society) athletes
Recipients of the Presidential Order of Excellence